Aleksandr Petrovich Gusev (21 February 1955 – 24 November 1994) was a field hockey player from the Soviet Union, who won the bronze medal with his national team at the boycotted 1980 Summer Olympics in Moscow, behind India and Spain.

References

External links
 

1955 births
1994 deaths
People from Sverdlovsk Oblast
Russian male field hockey players
Olympic field hockey players of the Soviet Union
Soviet male field hockey players
Field hockey players at the 1980 Summer Olympics
Olympic bronze medalists for the Soviet Union
Olympic medalists in field hockey
Place of birth missing
Medalists at the 1980 Summer Olympics
Sportspeople from Sverdlovsk Oblast